Frank Taylor (30 April 1916 – January 1970) was an English footballer and manager who played in the Football League for Wolverhampton Wanderers and managed Scarborough and Stoke City.

Playing career
Taylor was a full-back who started his playing career with Wolverhampton Wanderers in 1936. He made his senior debut on 13 March 1937 in a 1–0 win at Chelsea. He played in the same team as his older brother Jack a handful of times, but it was only after his sibling left the club in Summer 1938 that Frank became a first team regular.

Taylor missed just one game of the 1938–39 season that saw Wolves reach the 1939 FA Cup Final, where they lost 4–1 to Portsmouth at Wembley. The suspension of league football in September 1939 due to the outbreak of World War II effectively ended Taylor's playing career. Although he turned out in some wartime fixtures for Wolves, he left the club and playing football in 1944.

Management career
In June 1948 Taylor was appointed manager of Scarborough, and then became Frank Buckley's assistant at Hull City, also doing a similar role at Leeds United before becoming Stoke City manager in 1952.

Taylor had the tough task of taking over from the long-serving Bob McGrory who had been at Stoke for 31 years as a player and manager. The first act Taylor did was to erect a sign above the players dressing room which read:  Are you 90 minutes fit? It's the last 20 minutes that count – train for it. In his first season Stoke were relegated from the First Division after losing their final match of the season. Taylor's main task now was to gain a return to the top tier but narrowly missed out in 1954–55, 1956–57 and 1958–59 finishing 5th three times. But after an awful 1959–60 campaign which saw Stoke finish in 17th position and could have been relegated to the third tier, chairman Albert Henshall decided that Stoke were going backwards and not forwards and so Taylor was sacked. This came as a big shock to Taylor who vowed never to become involved with football again.

Career statistics

As a player
Source:

As a manager

Honours
Wolverhampton Wanderers
FA Cup runner-up: 1939

References

1916 births
1970 deaths
English footballers
English Football League players
Stoke City F.C. managers
Scarborough F.C. managers
Wolverhampton Wanderers F.C. players
English Football League managers
Association football fullbacks
English football managers
FA Cup Final players